University of Maragheh is a public university in the city of Maragheh, in East Azerbaijan Province, Iran. The university is a state-funded institution which has 4 faculties and 14 departments. Coming from different parts of Iran, approximately 3000 students attend Maragheh university. In addition, famous enough in the region, Maragheh University enjoys computer sites, modern facilities and laboratories. It was built on foundations from agricultural education. The Agricultural College of Maragheh began life in 1987 under the auspices of the University of Tabriz, and remained part of it until attaining Higher Education Centre status in 2005.

History
The Agriculture Institute of Maragheh was founded in 1987-under the auspices of University of Tabriz. The state-funded institute conferred associate degrees that generally took two years. With the continued efforts of the officials then and the agreement of Council of Higher Education Development (CHED), the institute developed into Agriculture College of Maragheh in 1999. The college was considered as a branch of Tabriz University until 2005. On April 30, 2005, the CHED agreed with further expansion and development of the college; as a result, it turned into the Higher Education Center of Maragheh. Later on January 13, 2007, the CHED recognized the center as Maragheh University. With budget allocation to the university in 2008, it became financially independent. Finally, the official agreement of the CHED with the establishment of Maragheh University was issued on May 30, 2009.

Faculties
 School of Science
 School of Engineering
 School of Humanitarian Science
 School of Agriculture

See also
Higher education in Iran
List of universities in Iran

References

Mara
Educational institutions established in 1987
1987 establishments in Iran
Buildings and structures in East Azerbaijan Province
Education in East Azerbaijan Province
Maragheh